This is a list of ASEAN countries by GDP.

List 2023 
GDP and GDP per capita data are according to IMF for 2023 data.

List 2022 
GDP and GDP per capita data are according to IMF for 2022 data.

List 2021 
GDP and GDP per capita data are according to IMF 2021 data.

See also
List of ASEAN country subdivisions by GDP

References

ASEAN
GDP
ASEAN countries GDP
GDP ASEAN